John Goldsberry (born October 19, 1982) is a retired American professional basketball player who last played for Brose Baskets of the German League. Standing at 1.91 m (6 ft 3 in) in height, he played at the point guard and shooting guard positions.

High school
Goldsberry attended Butler High School, in Vandalia, Ohio, where he played basketball.

College career
After high school, Goldsberry played NCAA Division I college basketball at North Carolina-Wilmington, where he played with the UNC Wilmington Seahawks, from 2002 to 2006.

Professional career
Goldsberry began his pro career in 2006 with the German League club Giants Leverkusen. In 2007, he moved to the German club Artland Dragons. In 2008, he joined the German club Brose Baskets Bamberg. He re-signed with Brose in 2013. In May 2014, Goldsberry, along with his longtime teammate Casey Jacobsen, retired from the professional basketball, spending last six seasons of his career with Brose Baskets. In tribute to him, Brose Baskets retired his 5 jersey number in 2014.

Awards and accomplishments

College
 All-CAA First Team: (2005)

Pro career
 4× German League Champion: (2010, 2011, 2012, 2013)
 4× German Cup Winner: (2008, 2010, 2011, 2012)
 3× German Supercup Winner: (2010, 2011, 2012)
 Number 5 jersey retired by Brose Baskets: (2014)

References

External links
 Euroleague.net Profile
 FIBA Profile
 FIBA Europe Profile
 Eurobasket.com Profile
 Draftexpress.com Profile
 College Stats

1982 births
Living people
American expatriate basketball people in Germany
American men's basketball players
Artland Dragons players
Basketball players from Ohio
Bayer Giants Leverkusen players
Brose Bamberg players
People from Vandalia, Ohio
Point guards
Shooting guards
UNC Wilmington Seahawks men's basketball players